The first pilgrimage or Umrah of Dhu'l-Qada (Pilgrimage of the 11th month) was the first pilgrimage that the Islamic prophet Muhammad and the Muslims made after the Migration to Medina. It took place on the morning of the fourth day of Dhu al-Qi'dah 7 AH (629 CE), after the Treaty of Hudaybiyyah 6 AH (628 CE). The entire event was three days long.

A pilgrimage that occurs during the month of Dhu al-Hijjah is named a "major pilgrimage", or just "pilgrimage" (Ḥajj), while pilgrimages of all other months are called "minor pilgrimage" (‘Umrah).

History
Muhammad, the prophet, had reported that from the age of 40, he was receiving revelations from God. He and his followers, called Muslims, were persecuted by the ruling clan of Mecca, the Quraysh, and forced to leave to the northern city of Medina. Several armed confrontations followed, along with the Muslims attempting a return pilgrimage to Mecca in 628, as directed by one of the revelations. They were rejected by the Quraysh, but the Meccans did agree to a truce, and the Treaty of Hudaybiyyah had a provision that the Muslims could return peacefully to Mecca for a pilgrimage in 629.

Pilgrimage
Ar-Raḥīq Al-Makhtūm ("The Sealed Nectar"), in the chapter The Compensatory ‘Umrah (Lesser Pilgrimage) the event is described as follows:

See also
The Farewell Pilgrimage

References

Life of Muhammad
Islamic terminology